G. gigantea may refer to:
 Geochelone gigantea, the Aldabra giant tortoise, a reptile species found on the islands of the Aldabra Atoll in the Seychelles
 Grallaria gigantea, the giant antpitta, a perching bird species
 Gymnostachys gigantea, a plant species native to Australia

See also
 Gigantea (disambiguation)